Michael J. Marcotte (born 1958) is a Republican politician who was elected and is a current member of the Vermont House of Representatives. He represents the Orleans-2 Representative District.  He is also the current Select Board Chairman for the Town of Coventry, VT.

References

External links
 List of legislators in the Vermont lower chamber

1958 births
Living people
Republican Party members of the Vermont House of Representatives
21st-century American politicians